Helen Elizabeth Phillips, also known as Helen Phillips Hayter (March 3, 1913 – January 23, 1995
) was an American sculptor, printmaker, and graphic artist active in San Francisco, New York, and Paris.

Early life and education 
Helen Elizabeth Phillips was born on March 3, 1913, in Fresno, California. 

From 1932 to 1936, she studied at the California School of Fine Arts (now the San Francisco Art Institute) in San Francisco with Ralph Stackpole and Gottardo Piazzoni. In 1936, Phillips won the school's Phelan Travelling Fellowship, a competitive scholarship with which she funded a year of study in Paris. From 1936, Phillips associated with Atelier 17, an experimental and collaborative intaglio printmaking workshop operating in the heart of Montparnasse. During World War II, Phillips returned to the United States and began working within the emerging literary and artistic circles of the New York School.

Work 
Phillips executed sculptures in bronze, stone and wood and produced intaglio prints. Her work is often non-figurative, however, she also worked with semi-abstract, anthropomorphic forms in both print and three-dimensional media.

Personal life 
Phillips met English printmaker Stanley William Hayter while studying engraving at Atelier 17 in Paris. The artists married in 1940 and divorced in 1972. Phillips died on January 23, 1995, in New York City.

Collections 
 Albright-Knox Art Gallery, Buffalo, New York
 Fine Arts Museums of San Francisco, San Francisco, California
 Museum of Modern Art, New York City, New York
 San Francisco Museum of Modern Art, San Francisco, California
Smithsonian American Art Museum, Washington, D.C.
 Sterling and Francine Clark Art Institute, Williamstown, Massachusetts
 Treasure Island Museum, San Francisco, California

References 

Sculptors from California
1913 births
1995 deaths
American printmakers
20th-century American women artists
American women printmakers
Artists from San Francisco
Atelier 17 alumni
Artists from New York City
People from Fresno, California
San Francisco Art Institute alumni